Head harness can mean:
 head harness (weight training) used in weight training 
 a bondage harness used in head bondage